The Itat Formation (Russian: итатская свита) is a geologic formation in western Siberia. It was deposited in the Bajocian to Bathonian ages of the Middle Jurassic. Dinosaur remains are among the fossils that have been recovered from the formation, including the proceratosaurid Kileskus, as well as fish, amphibians, mammals and many other vertebrates. The formation is noted for bearing significant coal reserves, with large open pit coal mines extracting lignite from the unit currently in operation.

Lithology 
The lower section of the formation is around 50–130 m thick, and consists of light grey sandstones with gravel, siltstone and rare coal beds. At the Dubinino locality, the 50 m exposed section of the upper part of the formation shows an irregular rhythmic alteration of fine grained sandstone, siltstone and mudstone and coal seams typically a few tens of cm's but up to several meters thick. The deposit is located on the South Eastern margin of the West Siberian basin

Locality 
Most of the fossils were found in the overburden of Berezovsk coal mine[ru], which is located in southern Krasnoyarsk Krai (Sharypovsky District) near the border with Kemerovo Oblast. The deposit is stratigraphically located in the upper member of the formation. The fossiliferous level of the locality is located above thick (> 50 m) coal seams and consists of unconsolidated silt and sand, which were deposited on an alluvial plain. Due to the fluvial origin of the sediment the remains are disarticulated and often are water worn, though they are mostly well preserved, which suggests they had not been significantly transported. The fossils were largely obtained by screenwashing of the debris. 10-15 tons of material have been processed so far.

Paleobiota 
Taken from unless otherwise noted.

Fish

Amphibians

Turtles

Lepidosauromorphs

Choristoderes

Pterosaurs

Crocodyliforms

Dinosaurs

Mammaliamorphs

Insects 
Numerous insect species are known from the Kubekovo village locality located within the upper member of the formation.

Flora

See also 
 List of dinosaur-bearing rock formations

References 

Geologic formations of Russia
Jurassic System of Asia
Jurassic Russia
Bathonian Stage
Bajocian Stage
Paleontology in Russia
Formations